Maniaki (before 1927: Κολάρτζα - Kolartza) is a village in Florina Regional Unit, Macedonia, Greece.

The Greek census (1920) recorded 541 people in the village and in 1923 there were 540 inhabitants who were Muslim. Following the Greek-Turkish population exchange, in 1926 within Kolartza there were 55 refugee families from Pontus. The Greek census (1928) recorded 242 village inhabitants. There were 58 refugee families (219 people) in 1928.

References 

Populated places in Florina (regional unit)

Amyntaio